M.I.M.E.O. (or MIMEO) is an experimental electroacoustic free improvisation group formed in 1997 on the initiative of several independent concert promoters in Europe. The abbreviation stands for "Music In Movement Electronic Orchestra". They have issued recordings on Erstwhile Records, Cathnor, Perdition Plastics, Grob, and other labels.

Their album Sight (2007) was inspired by painter Cy Twombly. Each of the eleven members of M.I.M.E.O. (spread across Europe) placed approximately five minutes of sound anywhere they chose onto a blank sixty-minute CDR. This was done independently of one another, with no communication between the musicians about how or where the music should be distributed on the disc. The CDRs were then compiled onto one CD and sent to a pressing plant.

Pianist John Tilbury joined the group to record the album The Hands of Caravaggio (2001, Erstwhile). Critic Brian Olewnick describes the album as "A staggering achievement, one is tempted to call The Hands of Caravaggio the first great piano concerto of the 21st century."

Members
Though some members have been temporarily replaced when unavailable for recording or performing, the group now consists of:

Phil Durrant - software synth / digital sampler
Christian Fennesz - computer
Cor Fuhler - electronics, piano, organ
Thomas Lehn - analogue synthesizer
Kaffe Matthews - computer
Jerome Noetinger - electroacoustic devices
Gert-Jan Prins - electronics, radio, TV, percussion
Peter Rehberg - computer
Keith Rowe - prepared guitar
Marcus Schmickler - computer, synthesizer
Rafael Toral - custom electronics

Recordings
 Electric Chair + Table (2000) Grob
 The Hands of Caravaggio (2001) Erstwhile
 Lifting Concrete Lightly (2004) Serpentine Gallery
 Sight (2007) Cathnor Recordings
 Wigry (2011) Bôłt, BR LP01, Monotype Records, monoLP006

References

M.I.M.E.O.
M.I.M.E.O.
M.I.M.E.O.